Khamr generally refers to wine of fermented grapes or dates.

It may also refer to:
 Khamr, Iran, also known as Deh-e Khamr – a village in Sistan and Baluchestan Province, Iran
 Khamr, Iran, also known as Khamar-e Qalandaran – a village in Hormozgan Province, Iran
 Khamr, Yemen – a village in central west Yemen